The Greeks is a 1951 non-fiction book on classical Greece by University of Bristol professor and translator H. D. F. Kitto. The book was first published as a hardback copy by Penguin Books, but has been republished in several formats since its initial publication. The Greeks serves as an introduction to the whole range of life in ancient Greece and established Kitto as one of the foremost Grecian scholars of his time.

Kitto begins the book:

Chapters
 Introduction
 The Formation of the Greek People
 The Country
 Homer
 The Polis
 Classical Greece: The Early Period
 Classical Greece: The Fifth Century
 The Greeks at War
 The Decline of the Polis
 The Greek Mind
 Myth and Religion
 Life and Character
 Index

Reception
The book's critical reception was positive, with the Sunday Times and Observer both praising The Greeks; several textbooks list it as a source or recommended read on the subject of ancient Greece. The Princeton Alumni Weekly praised Kitto for "not [glossing] over the failures and imperfections of the Greeks", and said the book would "delight the reader interested in things Greek with a fresh and vigorous approach to the classics".

The Greeks is mentioned in one of the best selling philosophy books of all times, Zen & The Art of Motorcycle Maintenance (1974) by Robert Pirsig (USA). In chapter 29 Pirsig uses The Greeks to expand on one of his key concepts, that of Quality. He finds it to be aligned to the Old Greek concept of Virtue and the Hindu concept of Dharma.

References

1951 non-fiction books
Classical Greece
History books about ancient Greece